King's Resort is a casino and resort located in Rozvadov, Czech Republic. The casino currently houses the largest poker room in Europe.

History 
In 2002, art collector and poker player Leon Tsoukernik decided to open a casino. King's Casino Rozvadov opened on 26 June 2003. In 2015, its cooperation with the World Series of Poker (WSOP) started with a WSOP Circuit Event. King's Casino has hosted the WSOP Europe since 2017 (and will last until 2021, or potentially longer). In 2018, the King’s Casino was renamed to King's Resort.

Approximately two hundred thousand poker players played in the casino in 2014. Over €15 million was paid out to players in poker tournament price pools that year. Tsoukernik closed a deal with the organizers of the World Series of Poker for the first WSOP Circuit Festival hosted in the Czech Republic. In 2017 the Czech Republic took over hosting the WSOP Europe.

The 2017 €10,350 WSOPE Main Event was won by Marti Roca De Torres and the $111,111 One Drop High Roller was won by Dominik Nitsche. The 2018 €10,350 WSOPE Main Event was won by Jack Sinclair and the €100,000 Super High Roller was won by Martin Kabrhel.

In 2017, over thirty thousand players attended the WSOPE, making it the most successful WSOPE to date. The success of the Czech premiere led to a deal, which allows the WSOPE to take place in the Czech Republic annually until 2022, with further cooperation being open for discussion. The WSOPE Festivals had been held every second year.

The casino hosted professional poker player, Tony G's birthday, holding a €200,000 guaranteed PLO tournament.

Casino 
The gambling area measures 64,584 ft2 or 6,000 m2. In 2009, the casino began focusing on poker. King's Casino has over 160 poker tables making it the largest poker room in Europe. Poker tournaments are offered daily with guaranteed prize pools ranging €3,000 and higher.

The casino features roulette, blackjack, baccarat, craps. Over 300 slot machines are also present on the casino floor.

The total capacity of the hotel is approximately 400 rooms and is equipped with a Japanese, Turkish and Swedish sauna, as well as, a fitness studio and swimming pool. An art gallery is located between the hotel and gambling area with 25 art pieces featuring the Daimler Motorkutsche (1886) and the Benz Patent-Motorwagen (1886) by Andy Warhol, a Swarovski armchair, and works by Václav Radimský and Tony Cragg.

References

External links

Buildings and structures in the Plzeň Region
Tachov District
Casinos completed in 2003